Phthalaldehyde (sometimes also o-phthalaldehyde or ortho-phthalaldehyde, OPA) is the chemical compound with the formula C6H4(CHO)2. It is one of three isomers of benzene dicarbaldehyde, related to phthalic acid.  This pale yellow solid is a building block in the synthesis of heterocyclic compounds and a reagent in the analysis of amino acids.  OPA dissolves in water solution at pH < 11.5. Its solutions degrade upon UV illumination and exposure to air.

Synthesis and reactions
The compound was first described in 1887 when it was prepared from α,α,α’,α’-tetrachloro-o-xylene.  A more modern synthesis is similar: the hydrolysis of the related tetrabromo-o-xylene using potassium oxalate, followed by purification by steam distillation.

The reactivity of OPA is complicated by the fact that in water it forms both a mono- and dihydrate, C6H4(CHO)(CH(OH)2) and C6H4(CH(OH))2O, respectively.  Its reactions with nucleophiles often involves the reaction of both carbonyl groups.

Biochemistry
OPA is used in a very sensitive fluorogenic reagent for assaying amines or sulfhydryls in solution, notably contained in proteins, peptides, and amino acids, by capillary electrophoresis and chromatography. OPA reacts specifically with primary amines above their isoelectric point Pi in presence of thiols. OPA reacts also with thiols in presence of an amine such as n-propylamine or 2-aminoethanol. The method is spectrometric (fluorescent emission at 436-475 nm (max 455 nm) with excitation at 330-390 nm (max. 340 nm)).

Disinfection
OPA is commonly used as a high-level disinfectant for medical instruments, commonly sold under the brand names of Cidex OPA or TD-8. Disinfection with OPA is indicated for semi-critical instruments that come into contact with mucous membranes or broken skin, such as specula, laryngeal mirrors, and internal ultrasound probes.

Poly(phthalaldehyde)
OPA can be polymerized. In the polymer, one of the oxygen atoms forms a bridge to the other non-ring carbon of the same phthalaldehyde unit, while the other bridges to a non-ring carbon of another phthalaldehyde unit. Poly(phthalaldehyde) is used in making a photoresist.

In winemaking
The Nitrogen by O-Phthaldialdehyde Assay (NOPA) is one of the methods used in winemaking to measure yeast assimilable nitrogen (or YAN) needed by wine yeast in order to successfully complete fermentation.

Isomeric phthalaldehydes
 isophthalaldehyde (benzene-1,3-dicarbaldehyde)
 terephthalaldehyde (benzene-1,4-dicarbaldehyde)

References

Benzaldehydes